Areas and locations in the United States where Orthodox Jews live in significant communities. These are areas that have within them an Orthodox Jewish community in which there is a sizable and cohesive population, which has its own eruvs, community organizations, businesses, day schools, yeshivas, and/or synagogues that serve the members of the local Orthodox community who may at times be the majority of the population.

An appearance on this list does not mean that the place listed is inhabited entirely by Orthodox Jews, nor that Orthodox Jews constitute the majority of the population of the place listed. While some of the communities listed are nearly entirely Orthodox, most are cohesive Orthodox communities that exist within a larger, non-Orthodox community. In many cases, there are other cohesive communities within the same area comprising other religious and/or ethnic groups.

The majority of Orthodox Jews in the United States live in the Northeast U.S. (particularly New York and New Jersey), but many other communities in the United States have Orthodox Jewish populations. This list includes Haredi, Hasidic, Modern Orthodox, and Sephardic Orthodox communities. The list does not include every location in the United States that contains a Chabad house, as the main purpose of these synagogues is to reach out to non-Orthodox populations.

Alabama 

 Birmingham

Arizona
North Central Phoenix
Scottsdale
Tucson

California

Southern California 

Beverly Hills
Beverlywood, Los Angeles
Bixby Knolls, Long Beach
College Area, San Diego
Encino, Los Angeles
Fairfax District, Los Angeles
Hancock Park, Los Angeles
La Jolla, San Diego
Northridge, Los Angeles
Pico-Robertson, Los Angeles
Tarzana, Los Angeles
University Park, Irvine
Valley Village, Los Angeles
Westwood, Los Angeles
Woodland Hills, Los Angeles

Northern California 

Arden-Arcade
Berkeley
Oakland
Outer Richmond, San Francisco
Palo Alto
Sunset District, San Francisco

Colorado

Greenwood Village
Hilltop, Denver
Washington Virginia Vale, Denver
West Colfax, Denver

Connecticut 

 Ellington
 New Haven
 New London
Norwich
 Stamford
 Waterbury
 West Hartford

District of Columbia
 Georgetown
 Shepherd Park

Florida

Aventura
Boca Raton
Boynton Beach
Deerfield Beach
Delray Beach
Dr. Phillips, Orlando
Hollywood
Miami Beach
North Miami Beach
Ormond Beach
Palm Beach
South Jacksonville
Tampa
West Palm Beach

Georgia

Dunwoody
Toco Hills, North Druid Hills
Sandy Springs
Savannah

Illinois

Lincolnwood
Northbrook
Skokie
West Ridge/West Rogers Park, Chicago

Indiana

Indianapolis
South Bend

Iowa

Postville

Kansas

Overland Park

Kentucky 

Louisville

Louisiana
New Orleans

Maryland

Bethesda
Cheswolde, Baltimore
Fallstaff, Baltimore
Glen, Baltimore
Kemp Mill
Olney
Owings Mills
Park Heights, Baltimore
Pikesville
Potomac
Reisterstown
Rockville
Silver Spring

Massachusetts

Brighton
Brookline
Cambridge
Longmeadow/Springfield
Malden
Newton
Onset
Sharon

Michigan

Ann Arbor
Farmington Hills
Huntington Woods
Oak Park
Southfield
West Bloomfield

Minnesota

St. Louis Park
Highland Park, St. Paul

Missouri

Chesterfield
University City

Nebraska

Omaha

Nevada
Henderson
Summerlin

New Jersey

Central Jersey
Aberdeen
Allenhurst
Bradley Beach
Deal
East Brunswick
Eatontown
Edison
Elberon
Highland Park
Howell Township
Jackson Township
Lakewood Township
Lawrenceville
Loch Arbour
Long Branch
Marlboro
Manalapan
Monroe Township
Oakhurst
Red Bank
Toms River
Twin Rivers
West Long Branch

North Jersey
Bergenfield
Clifton
Elizabeth
Englewood
Fair Lawn
Fort Lee
Greenville, Jersey City
Hillside
Linden
Livingston
Mahwah
Maplewood
Morristown
Mount Freedom, Randolph
New Milford
Paramus
Parsippany
Passaic
Springfield
Teaneck
Tenafly
Union City
West Orange

South Jersey
Cherry Hill
Margate City

New York

With the largest Jewish population outside Israel, approximately one-third of all Jews in New York are now Orthodox Jews.

Bronx 
Baychester
Pelham Parkway
Riverdale

Brooklyn
Bensonhurst
Borough Park
Crown Heights
Flatbush
Gravesend
Kensington
Manhattan Beach
Marine Park
Midwood
Mill Basin
Sheepshead Bay
Williamsburg

Manhattan 
Lower East Side
Upper East Side
Upper West Side
Washington Heights

Queens 
Bayswater
Belle Harbor
Far Rockaway
Forest Hills
Fresh Meadows
Hillcrest
Hollis Hills, Queens Village
Holliswood
Jamaica Estates
Kew Gardens
Kew Gardens Hills
Rego Park
Richmond Hill
Sunnyside

Staten Island
Manor Heights
Westerleigh
Willowbrook

Long Island
Atlantic Beach
Cedarhurst
Coram
East Meadow
East Northport
Great Neck
Hewlett
Huntington
Inwood
Lawrence
Lido Beach
Long Beach
Lynbrook
Merrick
New Hyde Park
North Bellmore
Oceanside
Patchogue
Plainview
Westhampton Beach, Southampton
West Hempstead/Franklin Square
Woodmere

Orange County 
Blooming Grove
Chester
Monroe
Palm Tree
Kiryas Joel
Woodbury
Harriman

Rockland County 

 Ramapo
Airmont
Kaser
Monsey
New Hempstead
New Square
Spring Valley
Wesley Hills

Sullivan County 

 Bethel
 Kauneonga Lake
 Bloomingburg
 Fallsburg
Loch Sheldrake
South Fallsburg
Woodridge
Woodbourne
 Kiamesha Lake
 Thompson
Monticello

Upstate

 Albany
 Buffalo
Poughkeepsie
 Rochester
 Schenectady
 Syracuse
 Wawarsing
Ellenville
 Williamsville

Westchester County
Fleetwood, Mount Vernon
Harrison
Mount Kisco
New Rochelle
Scarsdale
White Plains
Yonkers

Ohio

Amberley
Beachwood
Bexley
Berwick, Columbus
Cleveland Heights
Golf Manor
University Heights

Oregon

Hillsdale, Portland

Pennsylvania

Allentown
Center City, Philadelphia
Elkins Park
Kingston
Lancaster
Lower Merion Township
Bala Cynwyd
Merion Station
Penn Wynne
Wynnewood
Newtown
Northeast Philadelphia
Bustleton
Rhawnhurst
Somerton
Scranton
South Philadelphia
Squirrel Hill, Pittsburgh
Uptown, Harrisburg
Yardley

Rhode Island

Newport
Providence

South Carolina 

 Myrtle Beach

Tennessee

East Memphis
Southwestern Nashville

Texas

Brays Oaks/Meyerland, Houston
North/Far North Dallas
Northwest Austin
Northwest San Antonio

Virginia 

Fairfax
Norfolk
Richmond
Virginia Beach

Washington

Mercer Island
Ravenna, Seattle
Seward Park, Seattle

Wisconsin

Bayside
Glendale
Lake Park, Milwaukee
Mequon
Sherman Park, Milwaukee
Shorewood
Whitefish Bay

References 

.Orthodox Jewish communities
.Communities
.
Orthodox Jewish communities